Masarrochos is a village in the district Pobles del Nord in the municipality of Valencia, Spain. The locality has a population of 2,319.

Sources 

Geography of Valencia